Chandreswar Prasad Sinha was an Indian jurist who served as Governor of Assam from 23 August 1959 to 14 October 1959 and Chief Justice of Assam.

References 

Governors of Assam